Before Morning is a 1933 American pre-Code crime drama directed by Arthur Hoerl, and starring Leo Carrillo, Lora Baxter, and Taylor Holmes. The film was
adapted for the screen by 
Arthur Hoerl, from the 1933 Broadway play of the same name by Edward and Edna Riley.

Synopsis
Actress Elsie Manning (Lora Baxter) is engaged to Horace Baker (Blaine Cordner), but has also been in a romantic relationship with James Nichols (Russell Hicks) who has named her as the beneficiary in his will. Not knowing about her engagement, Nichols asks his wife for a divorce and is refused. Nichols dies in Manning's apartment after she tells him she's engaged to Baker. When Baker arrives on the scene, he agrees to help her dispose of the body by having Nichols moved to a sanitarium. The owner, Dr. Gruelle (Leo Carrillo), tells them Nichols was murdered by poison and attempts to extort money from Manning for his statement that the death was of natural causes. Gruelle tries the same scam on the widow of Nichols (Louise Prussing), who eventually agrees when the poison is found in her purse. It is revealed that Gruelle is really a police inspector named Mr. Maitland intent on solving the murder.

Cast
Leo Carrillo – Dr. Gruelle/Mr. Maitland
Lora Baxter as Elsie Manning
Taylor Holmes as Leo Bergman
Blaine Cordner as Horace Baker
Louise Prussing as Mrs. Nichols
Russell Hicks as James Nichols
Louis Jean Heydt as Neil Kennedy
Jules Epailly as Ben Ayoub
Constance Bertrand as Diane
Terry Carroll as Doris
Victor Kilian as House Detective (uncredited)

References

External links
 
 
 
 

1933 films
1933 crime drama films
1930s mystery drama films
1933 romantic drama films
American crime drama films
American independent films
American mystery drama films
American romantic drama films
American black-and-white films
American films based on plays
Films set in New York City
1930s independent films
1930s English-language films
1930s American films